Continuous revelation or continuing revelation is a theological belief or position that God continues to reveal divine principles or commandments to humanity.

In Christian traditions, it is most commonly associated with the Latter Day Saint movement, the Religious Society of Friends (Quakers), and with Pentecostal and Charismatic Christianity, though it is found in some other denominations as well.

Continuous revelation also forms part of the rituals of gatherings in various chapters of Taoism. In the Baháʼí Faith, progressive revelation is an important concept that is similar to continuous revelation.

A notable factor of continuous or continuing revelation as a source of divine commandments and statements is the written recording of such statements in an open scriptural canon, as is the case with the Latter Day Saints origin churches with Community of Christ in particular adding frequently to their Doctrine and Covenants in recent years. While more frequent with the Latter Day Saints, it is less frequent with the Baháʼí Faith, with progressive revelation only being periodically expanded over an extremely long period.

Baháʼí Faith

Progressive revelation is a core teaching in the Baháʼí Faith that suggests that religious truth is revealed by God progressively and cyclically over time through a series of divine messengers or prophets, known as Manifestation of God, and that the teachings are tailored to suit the needs of the time and place of their appearance. Baháʼí teachings consider several world religions as different stages in the history of one religion, while believing that the revelation of Baháʼu'lláh is the most recent (though there will never be a last), and therefore the most relevant to modern society.

Baháʼís believe each Manifestation of God establishes a covenant and founds a religion. This process of revelation, according to the Baháʼí writings, is also never ceasing. The general theme of the successive and continuous religions founded by Manifestations of God is that there is an evolutionary tendency, and that each Manifestation brings a larger measure of revelation (or religion) to humankind than the previous one.  The differences in the revelation brought by the Manifestations of God is stated to be not inherent in the characteristics of the Manifestation of God, but instead attributed to the various worldly, societal and human factors; these differences are in accordance with the "conditions" and "varying requirements of the age" and the "spiritual capacity" of humanity  which is increasing over time.

Christianity

Roman Catholicism and Eastern Orthodoxy
Vatican II states "no new public revelation is to be expected before the glorious manifestation of our Lord, Jesus Christ." The notion of progressive or continuing revelation is not held by the Roman Catholic Church or by Eastern Orthodoxy, who instead favor the idea of tradition and development of doctrine, while progressivist and continuationist approaches are specifically condemned in the declaration Dominus Iesus.

Protestantism
Protestants generally teach that the modern age is not a period of continuing revelation.

Latter Day Saints

In the Church of Jesus Christ of Latter-day Saints (LDS Church), continuing revelation is the principle that God or his divine agents still continue to communicate to humankind. Church founder Joseph Smith, Jr. used the example of the Lord's revelations to Moses in  Deuteronomy to explain the importance and necessity of continuous revelation to guide "those who seek diligently to know [God's] precepts":

The LDS Church believes in continuing revelation, not continuous revelation, and differentiates between the two.

Personal versus church-wide revelation
The Church makes a distinction between personal revelation and revelation directed to all members of the church. They believe that personal revelation can come to any individual with a righteous desire, for example to direct someone in their search for truth. In contrast, revelation for the entire church only comes to those who have been called by God as prophets, which in the LDS Church includes the First Presidency and the Quorum of the Twelve Apostles.

Opposition to continued revelation
Church members see the tendency to dismiss the possibility that God could call modern prophets as similar to the attitude of those in the Bible who rejected the prophets and/or apostles of their day; the sense of change in the message of Jesus and the apostles led many to regard them as false prophets. Jesus himself warned against false prophets, teaching that the way to distinguish between a true and a false prophet was "by their fruits"; however, the perceived threat to tradition was often a strong enough deterrent to cause the witnesses of good fruits (such as powerful sermons or miraculous healings) to dismiss them as the work of the devil. After Jesus ordained his apostles, he warned them of the extreme opposition they would encounter for these reasons, telling them, "ye shall be hated of all men for my name's sake". Jesus also said, "Woe unto you, when all men shall speak well of you! For so did their fathers to the false prophets," thus illustrating that opposition will naturally accompany a true prophet if they are doing their job correctly.

Apostasy
Sometimes the opposition against God's prophets escalated to the point of violence and martyrdom, which Jesus and the apostles frequently referenced while preaching to their detractors (Matt 23:31-37, Luke 11:47-51, Acts 7:52, Romans 11:3, 1 Thes 2:15). In this sense, church members acknowledge that revelation has not continued uninterrupted throughout history, being that the killing of God's prophets sometimes resulted in periods without church-wide revelation—which church members refer to as apostasies. Similar to prophets before them, Peter and the apostles also suffered martyrdom at the hands of their persecutors—with the exception of John who was banished to the Isle of Patmos. In contrast to the mainstream Christian view that the apostolic era came to a close because revelation had reached its completion.

Church members believe that once the Christian church was no longer led by revelation, its doctrine began to be altered by theologians who took it upon themselves to continue developing doctrine, despite not being called or authorized to receive revelation for the church body. In the absence of revelation, these theologians often resorted to speculation, which coupled with their own interpretations and extrapolations of scripture, inevitably resulted in disagreement and division on many doctrinal points. Ecumenical councils were held in order to settle these differences, yet without prophets called and authorized to reveal God's will on the topics being debated, the attendees could only vote on the theories presented in order to decide which ones would become official doctrine—a practice that served to ostracize as heretics those who did not go along with these decisions, and in some cases led to major schisms in the church. Church members view this process of doctrinal development as completely foreign to God's established pattern of revealing doctrine through a prophet. They point to history as incontrovertible proof that humans are incapable of agreeing on how to interpret the Bible (2 Pet 1:20), which should act as a strong indicator that God's purpose for the Bible was not to derive doctrine, but rather to support it. When doctrine is not established and maintained through continued revelation, Church members see the inevitable result as "philosophies of man, mingled with scripture".

Restoration
Church members again point to the Bible to show that after every period of apostasy, God always eventually called another prophet when the time was right. It is in that same spirit that church members claim that once conditions were ready, God again resumed his pattern of revealing his will through prophets by calling Joseph Smith, through whom he restored the fullness of the gospel of Jesus Christ, clearing up the error that had been introduced during the Great Apostasy. Church members believe that since that time, revelation through prophets and apostles has continued unbroken until the present day, God having promised that revelation will not be taken again from the earth before the Second Coming of Christ.

Open scriptural canon
The open scriptural canon of the LDS Church is based on the principle of continuous revelation. Its 9th Article of Faith states:

Members of the LDS Church anticipate additions to its canon, including the translation of the remaining two-thirds of the golden plates which was the source of the Book of Mormon.

Community of Christ
The Community of Christ (formerly the Reorganized Church of Jesus Christ of Latter Day Saints), the second largest Latter Day Saint denomination, regularly canonizes revelation into its Doctrine and Covenants. Continuing revelation is one of the enduring principles of the church which "define the essence, heart, and soul of our faith community. They describe the personality of our church as expressed throughout the world."

Prophetic people
In recent years, the church has begun to redefine the process of revelation from one that comes from the top down with an appointed Prophet providing revelation to the church to one that is more collaborative and bottom up with the people increasingly becoming involved in the revelatory process as a community. This change has included theological and procedural changes including concepts such as faithful disagreement which allows for open debate, dialogue and disagreement within the church body without consequence.

One of the most clear explications of the role of a prophetic people in the church was canonised in the church's Doctrine and Covenants on March 29, 2004.

Islam

The phrase  ("Seal of the Prophets") is a title used in the Quran to designate the prophet Muhammad. It is generally regarded to mean that Muhammad is the last of the prophets sent by God.

Ahmadiyya
Ahmadi Muslims believe that while law-bearing revelation has ended with the perfection of scripture in the form of the Quran, non-scriptural revelation to non-prophets as well as non law-bearing Muslim prophets continues. They cite Quranic verses as well as Ahadith considered by many to be authentic in support of their belief in continuous revelation.

Judaism
Reform Judaism is centered on a continual revelation and that "revelation is a continuous process, confined to no one group and to no one age," according to the Movement's 1937 Columbus Platform.

Conservative Judaism teaches God's revelation at Mount Sinai and God's continuing revelation through study of Jewish texts and through life as a Jewish believer.

Taoism

In various designated offshoots of Taoism like the De Schools in Malaysia, Singapore and Hong Kong, and the Dao Schools in Hong Kong, Taiwan and China, weekly or sometimes monthly gatherings are held at temples to receive and understand communications from above by way of two mediums holding rattan sifts writing on sand, who are 'dictated' with news ranging in contents from current affairs, religion, to arts and morality; the writings are called Sift Text or '乩文'.

See also
 Direct revelation
 General revelation
 Tertön
 Terma (religion)

Notes

Bahá'í belief and doctrine
Christian terminology
Latter Day Saint terms
Revelation
Revelation in Mormonism
Quaker theology